John Buchanan Richardson IV (born April 17, 1968) is a United States Army major general who has been the commanding officer of the 1st Cavalry Division since July 21, 2021. He previously served as the Deputy Commanding General of the III Corps from September 2, 2020, to July 2021. Before that, he served as the Deputy Chief of Staff for Operations, Plans, and Training of the United States Army Forces Command. Richardson is a 1991 graduate of the United States Military Academy.

Early life 
John B. Richardson IV was born in Baltimore, Maryland, to John B. Richardson III and Judith Ann Loucks.  His father served in the Federal Bureau of Investigation and later became a Certified Public Accountant and Forensic Accountant.  His mother is an Attorney. He grew up in Tallahassee, Florida and attended Maclay School where he held numerous student leadership positions, active in sports, and graduated in 1987. He was honored as Maclay’s 2015 Distinguished Alumnus.

Richardson attended the U.S. Military Academy at West Point and graduated in 1991, the fifth member of his family to attend West Point. He comes from an “old Army” family on his paternal side going back four generations. His great-grandfather, Colonel John B. Richardson, Sr., earned the Distinguished Service Cross, the nation’s second highest award for valor, during World War I, and his paternal grandfather served as an infantry battalion commander in the European Theater during World War II and commanded the 5th Cavalry Regiment in the 1st Cavalry Division in Japan and Korea 1953–54. His maternal grandparents were educators. His maternal grandfather, Dr. H. Donald Loucks, graduated from the University of Florida, completed ROTC and served as a math professor and basketball coach at West Point, then a professor of physical education and the first NCAA basketball and tennis coach at Florida State University and was a 1985 inductee into the FSU Athletic Hall of Fame. His paternal grandmother graduated from Wellesley College, and his maternal grandmother graduated from Florida State College for Women.

Personal life 
Richardson married his high school sweetheart Deanie in 1991 after her graduation from Florida State University, they have two children, Mary who attends Georgetown University Law and Johnny is an undergrad at University of Tennessee.

Civilian education 
 Bachelors in Military History: U.S. Military Academy at West Point
 Masters in Counseling and Leader Development: Long Island University
 Fellowship,  Leadership & Management: Harvard University, Kennedy School

Military education 
 Armor Officer Basic and Advance Courses 
 Command and General Staff College at Fort Leavenworth, Kansas 
 Joint and Combined Warfighting School in Norfolk, Virginia 

While attending Harvard University, in 2011 he published a monograph with a case study which provides a means for analyzing the complexity of organizational leadership: Real Leadership and the U.S. Army: Overcoming a Failure of Imagination to Conduct Adaptive Work (ISBN 9781304238597). The study presents a high-stakes problem set requiring an operational adaptation by a cavalry squadron in Baghdad, Iraq. This problematic reality triggers the struggle in finding a creative solution, as organizational culture serves as a barrier against overturning accepted norms that have proven successful in the past, even if they do not fit the current reality. The case study highlights leaders who are constrained by assumptions and therefore suffer the consequences of failing to adapt quickly to a changed environment. Emphasizing the importance of reflection, adaptation, and a willingness to experiment and assume prudent risk to seize opportunities, the case study transitions to an example of a successful application of adaptive leadership and adaptive work performed by the organization.

Publications by John B. Richardson IV 
Richardson is passionate about building cohesive teams and growing adaptive leaders as the foundation of high-performing and positive organizations. He has published a number of articles on empowering the work force to solve complex problems, building inclusive work climates, fostering participative leadership, and investing in human capital.

 Promotion Replaces Recognition: A Major Step Forward in an Evolving Leader Development System.  The ASSEMBLY Magazine, May–June, 2001, pg 37-40. By Captain John B. Richardson IV
 The Four-Tank Platoon: Maximizing Combat Power and Leader Development, ARMOR MAGAZINE, May–June 2002, pg 22-24 by Major John B. Richardson IV. https://www.benning.army.mil/armor/eARMOR/content/issues/2002/MAY_JUN/ArmorMayJune2002web.pdf
 Be the Hunter, Not the Hunted: Defeating the RKG-3 Ambush, ARMOR MAGAZINE, May–June 2009, pg 5-9 by Lt Colonel John B. Richardson IV. https://www.benning.army.mil/armor/eARMOR/content/issues/2009/MAY_JUN/ArmorMayJune2009web.pdf
 Real Leadership and the U.S. Army: Overcoming a Failure of Imagination to Conduct Adaptive Work Harvard University and US Army War College, Strategic Studies Institute, LeTort Papers, 2011: ISBN 9781304238597
By Lt Colonel John B. Richardson IV
https://publications.armywarcollege.edu/pubs/2168.pdf
 Sacrifice, Ownership, Legitimacy: Winning Wars By, With, and Through Host-Nation Security Forces, Joint Force Quarterly 89, April 12, 2018, pg 63-68. By BG John B. Richardson IV and MAJ John Q. Bolton. https://ndupress.ndu.edu/Media/News/News-Article-View/Article/1492058/sacrifice-ownership-legitimacy-winning-wars-by-with-and-through-host-nation-sec/
 APRIL 2021 BOOK REVIEWS. UNDERSTANDING THE TEAM BUILDS COHESION, a Book Review: By Maj. Gen. John B. Richardson IV,  ARMY Magazine, ed. April 2021: How to Be an Inclusive Leader: Your Role in Creating Cultures of Belonging Where Everyone Can Thrive. Jennifer Brown. Berrett-Koehler Publishers. 168 pages. https://www.ausa.org/articles/april-2021-book-reviews
 Campaign Streamers Must Account for All our Troops, ARMY Magazine, ed. July 2021, pg 15-17. By MG John Richardson and 1LT Grace Paley. https://www.ausa.org/issues/army-magazine-vol-71-no-7-july-2021

Military career 
Richardson was commissioned as an Armor Officer in 1991 from the U.S. Military Academy at West Point. He is a proud Armored Cavalryman. His first assignment was with the 1st Armored Division serving as a tank platoon leader, tank company executive officer, and battalion maintenance officer in 4th Battalion, 67th Armored Regiment in Friedberg, Germany. He was next assigned to the 1st Infantry Division serving as a battalion adjutant, tank company commander, and headquarters and headquarters company commander with the 1st Battalion, 34th Armored Regiment at Fort Riley, Kansas. While assigned to 1st Infantry Division he deployed to Bosnia (IFOR) as the command liaison officer to the Nordic-Polish Brigade. He then served as a Company Tactical Officer at West Point.

As a major he was assigned to the 2d Armored Cavalry Regiment. In the 2d ACR he served as the squadron operations officer for 2d Squadron in Sadr City, Baghdad, Iraq 2003-2004. Upon re-deployment he served as the regimental operations officer for the 2d Armored Cavalry Regiment at Fort Polk, Louisiana. In 2005, he deployed a second time to Iraq as the Aide-de-Camp to the Commanding General of Multi-National Security Transition Command – Iraq. He then served as a Career Manager in Armor Branch at U.S. Army Human Resources Command.

As a lieutenant colonel from 2007-2009, he served as the squadron commander of 5th Squadron, 4th Cavalry Regiment in the 1st Infantry Division. During this command the squadron deployed to northwest Baghdad from 2008-2009. In 2011, he assumed command as the 74th Colonel of the 3d Cavalry Regiment (Brave Rifles) at Fort Hood, Texas. Following regimental command, he served in the Pentagon on the Joint Staff.

After the tour in the Pentagon he deployed to Iraq in the fight against ISIS in Mosul serving as the Deputy Commanding General for 1st Infantry Division/CJFLCC-Operation Inherent Resolve. Returning from his fourth combat tour in Iraq, he then served as the Deputy Commanding General for the 3rd Infantry Division where he deployed to Afghanistan and commanded Train, Advise, Assist Command-East (TAAC-East) in the fight against ISIS-K and the Taliban.

In June 2018, he returned to the Pentagon and served on the Army Staff as the Director for Readiness, Operations, and Mobilization in the G3/5/7. In June 2019, he served as the Deputy Chief of Staff, G3/5/7 for U.S. Forces Command at Fort Bragg, North Carolina.

In September 2020, Richardson assumed duties as the Deputy Commanding General for III Corps, Fort Hood, Texas following the aftermath of the April 2020 murder of Army Specialist Vanessa Guillen.  Over the next year, Richardson would assist the III Corps Commander in leading the reforms recommended by the Fort Hood Independent Review Committee (FHIRC), to improve systemic issues of discipline, poor morale, and safety at the Nation’s second largest Army installation.  The ensuing III Corps “People First” initiatives would set a foundation for the Army’s transition to an inter-war period and focused on balanced and holistic readiness (People/Equipment/Training) required during an era of Great Power competition.

He assumed command of the 1st Cavalry Division at Fort Hood, Texas on July 21, 2021. As a Cavalryman his warfighting philosophy is simple: Seize and maintain the initiative, attack, penetrate, exploit, pursue the enemy relentlessly, and win decisively.

U.S. military decorations
 Defense Superior Service Medal for Combat Service 
 Defense Superior Service Medal with one bronze oak leaf cluster 
 Legion of Merit for Combat Service 
 Legion of Merit (with 2 Bronze Oak Leaf Clusters) 
 Bronze Star Medal for Valor 
 Bronze Star Medal (with 2 Bronze Oak Leaf Clusters) 
 Purple Heart 
 Defense Meritorious Service Medal 
| Army Meritorious Service Medal (with 4 Bronze Oak Leaf Clusters) 
 Joint Service Commendation Medal 
 Army Commendation Medal (with 2 Bronze Oak Leaf Clusters) 
 Joint Service Achievement Medal 
 Army Achievement Medal (with 4 Bronze Oak Leaf Clusters)

U.S. campaign medals, service medals and ribbons
 National Defense Service Medal with 1 bronze service star
 Armed Forces Expeditionary Medal
 Afghanistan Campaign Medal (with 1 Campaign Star)
 Iraq Campaign Medal (with 4 Campaign Stars) 
 Inherent Resolve Campaign Medal (with 2 Campaign stars)
 Global War on Terrorism Expeditionary Medal
 Global War on Terrorism Service Medal
 Armed Forces Service Medal
 Army Service Ribbon
 Army Overseas Service Ribbon (with Award Numeral 4)

Foreign decorations
| NATO Medal (with 2 Bronze Stars)- Former Yugoslavia, Iraq, Afghanistan 
 French National Defense Medal- Gold

Badges 
  Combat Action Badge 
Army Staff Identification Badge 
  7 Overseas Service Bars 

Basic Parachutist Badge

|Joint Chiefs of Staff Identification Badge 
 German Armed Forces Badge for Military Proficiency- Silver

Unit awards 
 Army Presidential Unit Citation

 Joint Meritorious Unit Award(with 2 Bronze Oak Leaf Cluster)

 Meritorious Unit Commendation(with 1 Bronze Oak Leaf Cluster)

 Superior Unit Award(with 1 Bronze Oak Leaf Cluster)

Regimental affiliation 

3rd Armored Cavalry Regiment Distinctive Unit Insignia

Shoulder sleeve insignia for former wartime service 
  2nd Cavalry Regiment (Iraq) 
 Multi-National Forces (Iraq) 
 NATO Mission (Iraq) 
 1st Infantry Division (Iraq) 
 3rd Infantry Division (Iraq and Afghanistan)

Honorary awards 
Order of the Spur (Gold and Silver) 
Order of St. George (Armor and Cavalry) 
Order of St. Barbara (Field Artillery)  
Order of St. Michael (Aviation) 
Order of St. Maurice (Infantry) 
Maclay School Distinguished Alumnus

References

|-

|-

|-

|-

Living people
Place of birth missing (living people)
United States Military Academy alumni
Recipients of the Legion of Merit
United States Army generals
Recipients of the Defense Superior Service Medal
1968 births